The French Academy is the pre-eminent French learned body on matters pertaining to the French language.

French Academy may also refer to:

Académie royale de peinture et de sculpture, an art school in Paris
 French Academy in Rome, an art school in Italy
 French Academy of Sciences, a scientific society
 French Academy of Technologies, a learned society with an emphasis on technology
 French academy (administrative body), the territorial administration that oversee secondary education in France

See also

 French academies